The Cifra 3  is a digital flip clock manufactured by Solari di Udine, S.p.A., Italy designed by Italian architect  (1923–2003) in 1965, with significant contribution from John Myer, a Belgian inventor. The Cifra 3 is widely considered a masterpiece of industrial design, using a split-flap display to display hours and minutes. The clock won the prestigious Compasso d'Oro prize for design and is on permanent display in the "Humble Masterpieces" exhibition at the Museum of Modern Art in New York and holds a place in the permanent collection of the Science Museum in London.

Design idea 
Gino Valle's relationship with the Solari company began in 1954 with the design of the Cifra 5 electromechanical digit-snap clock (patented in 1957), consisting of 4 vertical pallets of 10 numbers each making up all the hours. The Cifra 5 clock was the progenitor of a full-fledged family of industrial-type clocks, awarded the Compasso d'Oro in 1956. With the help of Belgian inventor John Meyer, a roll of 48 pallets was achieved, leading to the creation of the smallest direct-reading clock, the iconic Cifra 3, ideal for keeping at home or in the office.

References

 Storia del disegno industriale, prodotto: CIFRA 3, design: GINO VALLE
 The Solari Cifra 3 clock and Gino Valle's philanthropic vision
 MoMA|The Collection - The Cifra 3 Clock - MoMA Number: 719.1966
 PDF list (see p. 10) from MoMA's 2004 Humble Masterpieces exhibition

External links

  Solari di Udine S.p.A. official web site

Products introduced in 1965
Clocks